Five Dock railway station is a proposed station on the Sydney Metro West that will serve the Sydney suburb of Five Dock. It is scheduled to open with the rest of the line by 2030.

References

External links
Five Dock Metro station Sydney Metro

Proposed Sydney Metro stations
Railway stations scheduled to open in 2030